Air Atlas Express was a charter airline based in Morocco. It started operations on December 20, 2002, and ceased operations in 2004.

Fleet 
The Air Atlas Express fleet included:
1 Boeing 737-400 CN-REB

References

External links

Defunct airlines of Morocco
Airlines established in 2002
Airlines disestablished in 2004
2002 establishments in Morocco
2004 disestablishments in Morocco